Aldo Franchi (21 March 1882 – 19 November 1958) was an Italian racecar driver. Born in Milan, he lived most of his life in New York City.

Indy 500 results

References

External links
Aldo Franchi at ChampCarStats.com
Aldo Franchi at DriverDatabase
Aldo Franchi Indy 500 stats

1882 births
1958 deaths
Italian racing drivers
Indianapolis 500 drivers
Racing drivers from Milan